The Great Satraps' Revolt, or the Revolt of the Satraps (366-360 BC), was a rebellion in the Achaemenid Empire of several satraps against the authority of the Great King Artaxerxes II Mnemon. The Satraps who revolted were Datames, Ariobarzanes and Orontes of Armenia. Mausolus the Dynast of Caria participated in the Revolt of the Satraps, both on his nominal sovereign Artaxerxes Mnemon's side and (briefly) against him.

They were supported by the pharaohs of Egypt, Nectanebo I, Teos, and Nectanebo II, to whom was sent Rheomithres who came back with 50 ships and 500 talents, and all joined forces against Artaxerxes II.

Revolt of Datames (372-362 BC)

Datames, the satrap of Cappadocia and a talented military commander, had inherited his satrapy from his father Camissares after 384 BC  but later problems with the court led him to revolt in 372 BC. The court commanded the neighboring satraps, Autophradates of Lydia and Artumpara of Lycia, to crush the rebellion but Datames successfully resisted their attacks.

Datames was killed in 362 BC after his son in law Mitrobarzanes betrayed him, falsely claiming to be his ally against the Achaemenid king.

Revolt of Ariobarzanes (366-363 BC)
Ariobarzanes, satrap of Phrygia and a son of the ruler of Pontus, had been made acting satrap of Hellespontine Phrygia until Artabazos, the legitimate heir of the satrapy could take office. But when Artabazos was ready to take the satrapy Ariobarzanes refused to surrender it and joined Datames' revolt in 366 BC.

Ariobarzanes sought foreign aid and he received it from King Agesilaus II of Sparta.  Ariobarzanes withstood a siege at Adramyttium in 366 BC, from Mausolus of Caria and  Autophradates of Lydia, until Agesilaus negotiated the besiegers' retreat. As signal of sympathy in the effort, Athens made Ariobarzanes and three of his sons citizens of Athens. Ariobarzanes was betrayed by his son Mithridates to his overlord, the Persian king, who had Ariobarzanes crucified.

Revolt of Orontes (362 BC)

In 362 Orontes, satrap of Armenia, revolted after he was ordered by the King to move to Mysia. His noble birth led the other satraps to recognize him as leader of the revolt, but Orontes later sought a compromise with the King and betrayed the other satraps, and the rebellion collapsed shortly afterward. Orontes received much of the Aegean coast while Datames was killed after his son in law Mitrobarzanes betrayed him. Ariobarzanes was also killed, but the other satraps were pardoned, thus ending the rebellion.

References

Sources 

 p386
 p94

360s BC conflicts
Rebellions against the Achaemenid Empire
Ancient Anatolia
370s BC
360s BC
Artaxerxes II